The 1979 World Table Tennis Championships men's doubles was the 35th edition of the men's doubles championship.

Dragutin Šurbek and Antun Stipančić won the title after defeating István Jónyer and Tibor Klampár in the final by three sets to nil.

Results

See also
List of World Table Tennis Championships medalists

References

-